Arkadiusz Skrzypaszek (born 20 April 1968, Oświęcim) is a Polish modern pentathlete. He won two gold Olympic medals, both in Barcelona, 1992. Skrzypaszek won the individual and the team event. After the Barcelona games he retired.

References

1968 births
Living people
People from Oświęcim
Polish male modern pentathletes
Olympic modern pentathletes of Poland
Modern pentathletes at the 1988 Summer Olympics
Modern pentathletes at the 1992 Summer Olympics
Olympic gold medalists for Poland
Olympic medalists in modern pentathlon
Sportspeople from Lesser Poland Voivodeship
Medalists at the 1992 Summer Olympics